Asymphorodes is a gelechioid moth genus in subfamily Agonoxeninae of the palm moth family (Agonoxenidae), whose taxonomic status is disputed. Alternatively, the palm moths might be a subfamily of the grass-miner moth family (Elachistidae), with the Agonoxeninae becoming a tribe Agonoxenini.

Formerly, this genus was included in the cosmet moths (Cosmopterigidae). They are found in southern Polynesia as well as the Hawaiian and the Solomon Islands, and are notable for their adaptive radiation on the Marquesas Islands.

Description

These small moths come in a diverse range of more or less subdued colors and in their natural range can usually be distinguished by their wing venation: In the forewings, vein 1b is forked and vein 1c missing; veins 2 and 3 neither run parallel nor approach at the end, and vein 5 does not emerge from a common stalk with veins 6-8. In addition, like in some related moths the scape is short and bears a comb.

The male genitals are generally similar to those of cosmet moths, but this may be a symplesiomorphy. The vinculum is variously developed and the valvae thus attach variously far from the tegumen, though often quite closely. The gnathos is typically two-armed, but one of the arms may be underdeveloped or even missing altogether. The right manica is vestigial or missing, while the left one is set tightly against the aedeagus. Most characteristically though, the eighth sternal and fourth to seventh abdominal segments are modified, the former forming epitygmata ("genital flaps"). Like in some related moths, the males also have a tuft of hairs on the hindwing underside, which can be folded into a pocket in the wing cell. The uncus (in males) and signum (in females) are usually absent. As regards other features of the female genitals, the ovipositor is long while the ostium is usually well sclerotized and protrudes, but may be recessed into a deep pit in the seventh sternal segment.

Species
Species of Asymphorodes include:

 Asymphorodes acerba Meyrick, 1929
 Asymphorodes acritopterus J.F.G. Clarke, 1986
 Asymphorodes acrophrictis Meyrick, 1934
 Asymphorodes admirandus Meyrick, 1934
 Asymphorodes adynatus J.F.G. Clarke, 1986
 Asymphorodes aenigma J.F.G. Clarke, 1986
 Asymphorodes albicoma J.F.G. Clarke, 1986
 Asymphorodes amblysoma J.F.G. Clarke, 1986
 Asymphorodes aporema J.F.G. Clarke, 1987
 Asymphorodes aporia J.F.G. Clarke, 1986
 Asymphorodes astathopis (Meyrick, 1934) (formerly in Limnaecia)
 Asymphorodes balanotis Meyrick, 1934
 Asymphorodes bipunctatus J.F.G. Clarke, 1986
 Asymphorodes brevimacula J.F.G. Clarke, 1986
 Asymphorodes canicoma J.F.G. Clarke, 1986
 Asymphorodes chalcocoma J.F.G. Clarke, 1986
 Asymphorodes chalcopterus J.F.G. Clarke, 1986
 Asymphorodes chalcosoma J.F.G. Clarke, 1986
 Asymphorodes chalcozona 
 Asymphorodes chrysophanes J.F.G. Clarke, 1986
 Asymphorodes cicatricula J.F.G. Clarke, 1986
 Asymphorodes circopis Meyrick, 1929
 Asymphorodes cirsodes Meyrick, 1929
 Asymphorodes coesyrias Meyrick, 1929
 Asymphorodes culminis J.F.G. Clarke, 1986
 Asymphorodes cuneatus J.F.G. Clarke, 1986
 Asymphorodes diamphidius J.F.G. Clarke, 1986
 Asymphorodes didyma J.F.G. Clarke, 1986
 Asymphorodes diffidentia J.F.G. Clarke, 1986
 Asymphorodes dimorpha (formerly in Hyposmocoma) 
 Asymphorodes emphereia J.F.G. Clarke, 1986
 Asymphorodes ergodes Meyrick, 1934
 Asymphorodes favilla J.F.G. Clarke, 1986
 Asymphorodes flexa (Meyrick, 1921)
 Asymphorodes fractura J.F.G. Clarke, 1986
 Asymphorodes hemileucus J.F.G. Clarke, 1986
 Asymphorodes holoporphyra Meyrick, 1934
 Asymphorodes homosoma J.F.G. Clarke, 1986
 Asymphorodes honoria J.F.G.Clarke, 1986
 Asymphorodes hypostema J.F.G. Clarke, 1986
 Asymphorodes interstincta Meyrick, 1929 (may include A. poliopterus)
 Asymphorodes lenticula J.F.G. Clarke, 1986
 Asymphorodes leptotes J.F.G. Clarke, 1986
 Asymphorodes leucoloma J.F.G. Clarke, 1986
 Asymphorodes leucoterma Meyrick, 1929
 Asymphorodes lucerna J.F.G. Clarke, 1986
 Asymphorodes lucidus J.F.G. Clarke, 1986
 Asymphorodes macrogramma J.F.G. Clarke, 1986
 Asymphorodes mediostriatus J.F.G. Clarke, 1986
 Asymphorodes melanosoma J.F.G. Clarke, 1986
 Asymphorodes mesoxanthus J.F.G.Clarke, 1986
 Asymphorodes monoxesta 
 Asymphorodes montgomeryi J.F.G. Clarke, 1986
 Asymphorodes myronotus Meyrick, 1929
 Asymphorodes nebrias J.F.G. Clarke, 1986
 Asymphorodes nephocirca Meyrick, 1929
 Asymphorodes nigricornis J.F.G. Clarke, 1986
 Asymphorodes nuciferae J.F.G. Clarke, 1986
 Asymphorodes ochrogramma J.F.G. Clarke, 1986
 Asymphorodes oculisignis Meyrick, 1934
 Asymphorodes paraporia J.F.G. Clarke, 1986
 Asymphorodes phaeochorda Meyrick, 1929
 Asymphorodes phaeodelta J.F.G. Clarke, 1986
 Asymphorodes phalarogramma J.F.G. Clarke, 1986
 Asymphorodes plectographa Meyrick, 1929
 Asymphorodes plemmelia J.F.G. Clarke, 1986
 Asymphorodes poliopterus J.F.G. Clarke, 1986 (may belong in A. interstincta)
 Asymphorodes pollutus Meyrick, 1929
 Asymphorodes porphyrarcha Meyrick, 1929 (= A. xestophanes)
 Asymphorodes regina J.F.G. Clarke, 1986
 Asymphorodes remigiata J.F.G. Clarke, 1986
 Asymphorodes semileuteus J.F.G. Clarke, 1986
 Asymphorodes seminiger J.F.G. Clarke, 1986
 Asymphorodes sericeus J.F.G. Clarke, 1986
 Asymphorodes sphenocopa Meyrick, 1929
 Asymphorodes spintheropus (Meyrick, 1934) (formerly in Stagmatophora)
 Asymphorodes spodogramma J.F.G. Clarke, 1986
 Asymphorodes triaula (formerly in Hyposmocoma) 
 Asymphorodes trichogramma J.F.G. Clarke, 1986
 Asymphorodes trigrapha J.F.G. Clarke, 1986
 Asymphorodes valligera Meyrick, 1929 (= A. ingravescens)
 Asymphorodes xanthostola Meyrick, 1934

Footnotes

References
  (1986): Pyralidae and Microlepidoptera of the Marquesas Archipelago. Smithsonian Contributions to Zoology 416: 1-485. PDF fulltext (214 MB!)

Agonoxeninae
Fauna of the Marquesas Islands
Moth genera